This is a list of notable guerrilla movements. It gives their English name, common acronym, and main country of operation.

Latin America 
 Guatemalan National Revolutionary Unity (URNG)
 Sandinista National Liberation Front – Nicaragua
 Zapatista Army of National Liberation (EZLN) or Zapatistas – Chiapas, Mexico
 Jungle Commando – Suriname
 Contras – Nicaragua
 Morazanist Patriotic Front – Honduras
 Tupamaros Movimiento de Liberación Nacional Tupamaros – Uruguay

Argentina
Tacuara Nationalist Movement (Movimiento Nacionalista Tacuara – MNT) (1955–1966)
Justicialist National Militia (Milicia Nacional Justicialista - MNJ) (1955-1966)
 Peronist Armed Forces (Fuerzas Armadas Peronistas – FAP) (1968–1971)
 People's Revolutionary Army (Ejército Revolucionario del Pueblo – ERP) (1969–1976)
 Montoneros (Movimiento Peronista Montonero – MPM) (1970–1981)
 Libertarian Resistance (Resistencia Libertaria – RL) (1974–1978)
 Revolutionary Cells (Células Revolucionarias – CR) (2009–2011)
 Vandalika Teodoro Suárez Gang (Pandilla Vandalika Teodoro Suárez – PVTS) (2010–2011)
 Friends of the Earth (Amigxs de la Tierra – AdlT/FAI) (2011–2014)

Bolivia
 Zarate Willka Armed Forces of Liberation (FALZW)
 Ñancahuazú Guerrilla (ELN)
 Néstor Paz Zamora Commission (CNPZ)
 Túpac Katari Guerrilla Army (EGTK)
 Anarchic Cell For Revolutionary Solidarity (CASR)
 Revolutionary Left Movement

Chile
  Revolutionary Left Movement (MIR) (1965–1987)
  Lautaro Youth Movement (MJL) (1982–1994)
  Manuel Rodríguez Patriotic Front (FPMR) (1983–1997)
 Leon Czolgosz Autonomous and Destructive Forces (FADLC) (2006–2009)
  Revolutionary Anarchist Front (FAR) (2007–2009)
 Severino di Giovanni Antipatriot Band (BASG) (2007–2012)
 Jean Marc Rouillan Armed and Heartless Columns (CAD-JMR) (2008–2012)
 Iconoclastic Caravans for Free Will (CIPLA) (2009–2012)
 Efraín Plaza Olmedo Dynamite Band (BDEPO) (2009–2013)
  Weichán Auka Mapu (WAM) (2011–present)
  Antagonic Nuclei of the New Urban Guerrilla (NANGU) (2011–present)

Colombia
 Revolutionary Armed Forces of Colombia (FARC) (1964–2016)
 National Liberation Army (ELN) (1964–present)
 19th of April Movement (M–19) (1970–1990)
 Guevarista Revolutionary Army (1992–2008)
 Popular Liberation Army (1967–present)
 Simón Bolívar Guerrilla Coordinating Board (1987–1990s)
 Movimiento Armado Quintin Lame (1984–1991)
 Ernesto Rojas Commandos (1991–1992)
 Indigenous Revolutionary Armed Forces of the Pacific

Cuba
 Directorio Revolucionario Estudiantil (DRE) (1954–1966)
 26th of July Movement (M-26-7) (1955–1962)
 Second National Front of Escambray (SFNE) (1959–1964)
 Brigade 2506 (1960–1962)
 Alpha 66 (1961–present)

El Salvador
 Communist Party of El Salvador (PCS) (1930–1992)
 Farabundo Martí Liberation People's Forces (FPL) (1970–1992)
 Farabundo Martí National Liberation Front (FMLN) (1980–1992)
 National Resistance (RN) (1975–1992)
 People's Revolutionary Army (ERP) (1972–1992)

Mexico
 People's Guerrilla Group (GPG) (1963–1965)
 Party of the Poor (PdlP) (1967–1974)
 Zapatista Army of National Liberation (EZLN) (1994–present)
 Popular Revolutionary Army (EPR) (1996–present)
 Práxedis G. Guerrero Autonomous Cells of Immediate Revolution (CARI-PGG) (2009–2014)
 Mariano Sánchez Añón Insurrectional Cell (CI-MSA) (2010–2014)

Paraguay
 Paraguayan People's Army (EPP) (2008–present)
 United National Liberation Front (FULNA) (1960–1970)

Peru
 National Liberation Army (ELN) (1962–1965)
 Revolutionary Left Movement (MIR) (1962–1965)
 Communist Party of Peru (Shining Path) (PCP (SL)) (1980–present)
 Militarized Communist Party of Peru (MPCP) (1992–present)
 Túpac Amaru Revolutionary Movement (MRTA) (1982–1997)
 National Socialist Tercios of New Castile (2004-2009)

Venezuela
FALN
 Bolivarian Forces of Liberation
 Bandera Roja
Revolutionary Left Movement

North America 
 Atomwaffen Division – Anti-government neo-Nazi terrorist group
 Black Liberation Army – United States
 Caribbean Revolutionary Alliance – Guadeloupe
 Earth Liberation Front – United States
 MEChA's Brown Berets (paramilitary security force) – United States – "Border War"

Historical
 Symbionese Liberation Army – United States
 Weather Underground – United States
 Port7Alliance – United States
 Black Panther Party – United States
 Quantrill's Raiders led by William Quantrill – United States
 Front de libération du Québec – Canada
 Direct Action – Canada, Know by the media as Squamish Five. An Anarchist and Feminist self styled urban guerrilla group.
 The Order—United States
 3 Percenters – United States

Europe 
 National Liberation Army – North Macedonia
 Albanian National Army – North Macedonia, Kosovo, Serbia, Montenegro, Greece
 Kosovo Liberation Army (KLA) – Semi-recognised country of Kosovo
 Liberation Army of Preševo, Medveđa and Bujanovac – Serbia
 Chechen guerrillas under nominal leadership of Aslan Maskhadov (who is now deceased) – Chechnya

Ireland
 Continuity Irish Republican Army (CIRA) (1986–present)
Irish Citizen Army (1913-1947)
 Army Comrades Association (ACA) (1932 - 1935)
Irish People's Liberation Organization (1986 - 1992)
 Irish National Liberation Army (INLA) (1974–2009/present)
Official Irish Republican Army (1969-1990s)
Oglaigh na hEireann (CIRA splinter group) (2009–present)
  Provisional Irish Republican Army (IRA) (1969–1998)
  Real Irish Republican Army (RIRA) (1998–present)

Spain
 Basque Fatherland and Liberty (ETA) (1959–2017)
 First of October Anti-Fascist Resistance Groups (GRAPO) (1975–2007)
 Milícia Catalana (1976–1990s)
 Free Land (TL) (1978–1991)
 Guerrilla Army of the Free Galician People (EGPGC) (1986–1991)
 Revolutionary Antifascist Patriotic Front (FRAP) (1973–1978)
 Revolutionary Armed Struggle (LAR) (1978–1984)

Historic
 Lisowczycy (Polish)
 Snapphane Movement – Sweden, pro-Danish partisans that fought against the Swedes in the 17th century.
  Guerrilla warfare in the Peninsular War (Spain, Portugal)
 Briganti (Italy)
 Combat Organization of the Polish Socialist Party (Congress Poland, particularly active during the Polish events of the 1905 Russian Revolution)
 Irish Republican Army – Ireland (prior to the establishment of an independent state of Ireland)
 Kuva-yi Milliye during Turkish War of Independence – Turkey
 Internal Macedonian Revolutionary Organization – Macedonia (region)
 World War II Resistance movements in various countries, many sponsored by the United Kingdom and other Allied governments:
 Soviet partisans in the Axis-occupied territories during World War II
 Greek People's Liberation Army (ELAS) – Greece
 Polish resistance movement in World War II (many of these groups were a part of the Polish Underground State, the large guerrilla movement that initiated the Warsaw Uprising, as well as some other anti-Nazi partisan-warfare-based actions like the Zamość Uprising, the Battle of Osuchy, the Raid on Mittenheide, Operation Tempest, or Operation Heads).
 Henryk Dobrzański (Polish – the first guerrilla commander of the Second World War in Europe)
  Armia Krajowa (Home Army) (Polish)
 Leśni
 Silent Unseen
 Battalion Zośka
  Uderzeniowe Bataliony Kadrowe
 National Armed Forces
  Bataliony Chłopskie (Polish)
  Armia Ludowa (communist-ruled Poland)
 Bielski partisans (Jewish)
 Parczew partisans (Jewish)
 Yugoslav Partisans – Yugoslavia
 Chetniks – Yugoslavia
 Anti-Soviet partisans
 Forest Brothers – Estonia/Latvia/Lithuania (World War II–1952 approx.)
 Ukrainian Insurgent Army (UPA) – Ukraine
 Anti-communist resistance in Poland (1944–1953) (Polish)
 Cursed soldiers (Polish)
 Democratic Army of Greece, Communist partisans during the Greek Civil War – Greece
 Red Brigades  (BR, later split, BR-PCC and BR-UCC largest factions) – Italy
 Red Army Faction (RAF) – Western Germany, known also as Baader-Meinhof Gang
 National Organisation of Cypriot Fighters (EOKA) during Cyprus Emergency – Cyprus
 National Organisation of Cypriot Fighters-B (EOKA-B) during Cypriot intercommunal violence and Turkish invasion of Cyprus – Cyprus
 Turkish Resistance Organisation (TMT) during Cypriot intercommunal violence and Turkish invasion of Cyprus – Cyprus
 Action Directe (AD) – France

Africa 
  Republic of the Rif– Morocco Battle of Annual  Abd el-Krim's guerrilla  tactics influenced Ho Chi Minh, Mao Zedong, and Che Guevara.
 Umkhonto we Sizwe (MK) – South Africa (armed wing of the African National Congress)
 Ambazonia Defence Forces – Southern Cameroons/Cameroon (armed wing of the Ambazonia Governing Council)
Ambazonia Restoration Forces (ARF) - Southern Cameroon/Ambazonia (armed wing of the Interim Government of Ambazonia /IG)
 Southern Cameroons Defence Forces – Southern Cameroons/Cameroon (armed wing of the African People's Liberation Movement)
 Ambazonia Self-Defence Council – Southern Cameroons/Cameroon (umbrella organization consisting of armed groups loyal to the Interim Government of Ambazonia)
 Kenya Land and Freedom Army (KLFA or Mau Mau) – Kenya
 National Liberation Front of Angola (FNLA) – Angola (nationalist guerrillas who first fought the Portuguese and later Angola's communist led regime)
 Popular Movement for the Liberation of Angola (MPLA) – Angola (communist guerrillas who fought Portuguese rule and later established a Marxist regime)
 National Union for the Total Independence of Angola (UNITA) – Angola (anti-communist guerrillas backed by the United States and Apartheid South Africa. Angolan Civil War)
 Eritrean Liberation Front (ELF) – Eritrea
 Liberians United for Reconciliation and Democracy (LURD) – Liberia
 Popular Front for the Liberation of Saguia el Hamra and Rio de Oro (POLISARIO) – Western Sahara
 Zimbabwe African People's Union – Rhodesia/Zimbabwe.
 Mozambican Liberation Front (FRELIMO) – Mozambique (communist guerrillas who won independence from Portugal and established a Marxist regime)
 Mozambican National Resistance (RENAMO) – Mozambique (anti-communist guerrillas, supported by Rhodesia and South Africa, who fought in the Mozambican Civil War)
 South-West Africa People's Organization (SWAPO) – Namibia (an independence movement that fought South African rule during the Apartheid era)
 Movement for the Emancipation of the Niger Delta (MEND) – Nigeria
 Lesotho Liberation Army (LLA) – Lesotho
 Lord's Resistance Army (LRA) – Uganda
 Uganda People's Democratic Army – Uganda
 National Resistance Army – Uganda
 Azanian People's Liberation Army (earlier known as Poqo) – South Africa (armed wing of the PAC)
 Afrikaner Weerstandsbeweging (AWB) – South Africa
 Islamic Front for the Liberation of Oromia
 Oromo Liberation Front
 Sudan People's Liberation Army – SPLA. South Sudanese based rebel group that fought against the Islamist and Arab dominated regime in Khartoum during the Second Sudanese Civil War. They now control the independent nation of South Sudan
 Sudan Liberation Movement/Army
 Justice and Equality Movement
 Janjaweed
 Niger Movement for Justice
 Green Resistance – Gaddafi supporters in Libya post–2011
 Democratic Forces for the Liberation of Rwanda or FDLR – Successor to ALiR, Hutu extremists
 Army for the Liberation of Rwanda or ALiR – Hutu nationalists who fled Rwanda after the 1994 Genocide and took up arms in the neighbouring Democratic Republic of Congo
 Sudan People's Liberation Movement-in-Opposition or SPLM-IO (South Sudanese rebels fighting the SPLM led government since 2013. South Sudanese Civil War
 Alliance of Democratic Forces for the Liberation of Congo-Zaire  or the AFDL. These were anti-Mobutu rebels in the former Zaire during the First Congo War
 Rally for Congolese Democracy – RCD, anti-government forces backed by Rwanda during the Second Congo War
 Movement for the Liberation of Congo – anti-government forces backed by Uganda during the Second Congo War
 Somali National Movement (SNM) – Somaliland

Asia 
 East Turkistan Islamic Party (ETIP) - Xinjiang, China
 Northern Alliance – Afghanistan
 Taliban – Afghanistan
 Haqqani Network – Afghanistan
 Jundallah – Iran/Pakistan
 Free Joseon - North Korea
 Al-Qaeda – has been based in Afghanistan
 Mujahedin – (generic grouping) Afghanistan, Middle East
 Free Papua Movement – Indonesia
 Moro National Liberation Front (MNLF) – Philippines
 East Indonesia Mujahideen (MIT) - Indonesia
 Moro Islamic Liberation Front (MILF, a break away group of the MNLF) – Philippines
 New People's Army (NPA)  – Philippines
 Abu Sayyaf – Philippines
 Khmer National Unity Front (KNUF) – Cambodia
 Cambodian Freedom Fighters (CFF) – Cambodia
 Liberation Tigers of Tamil Eelam (Tamil Tigers) – Sri Lanka
 Lashkar-e-Toiba – based in Pakistan
 United Liberation Front of Asom – India/Bangladesh
 Balochistan Liberation Army – Pakistan
Balochistan Liberation Front - Pakistan 
Baloch Nationalist Army - Pakistan 
 Jammu Kashmir Liberation Front – Kashmir
Hizbul Mujahideen – Kashmir
 Jaish-e-Mohammed – Pakistan
 Naxalite Movement – India
 People's Liberation Army, Nepal – Nepal
 People's Liberation Guerrilla Army (India)                         — India (Andhra Pradesh)

Historical
 Chushi Gangdruk – Tibet, China
 Chinese Communist Party – China
 Pathet Lao – Laos
 Katipunan (KKK) – Philippines
 Righteous army - Korea
 Korean People's Guerrilla Army - Korea
 Khmer Rouge – Cambodia
 National Front for the Liberation of Vietnam (NLF) – Vietnam
 Hukbalahaps – Philippines
 Revolutionary Front of Independent East Timor (FRETILIN) East-Timor
 Viet Minh – Vietnam
 Communist Party of Malaya – Malaya/Malaysia
 Shivaji – India
 Free Aceh Movement – Aceh, Indonesia
 Saqqawists – Kingdom of Afghanistan
 People's Liberation Guerrilla Army                          (Andhra Pradesh) - India

Middle East
 Turkistan Islamic Party in Syria (TIP-S) - Syria
 Irgun 
 Lehi
 Ansar al-Islam
Popular Resistance Committees
 Hezbollah – Lebanon
 Popular Front for the Liberation of Oman
 Front for the Liberation of the Golan – Syria

Iran
Iranian People's Fadaee Guerrillas (IFPG) (1979–present)
 People's Mujahedin of Iran (MEK) (1965–present)
 Union of Iranian Communists (Sarbedaran) (UIC (S)) (1976–2001)

Palestine
Al-Aqsa Martyrs' Brigades (2000–present)
 Democratic Front for the Liberation of Palestine (DFLP) (1968–present)
 Hamas (1987–present)
 Palestinian Islamic Jihad (PIJ) (1987–present)
 Palestine Liberation Organization (PLO) (1964–present)
 Popular Front for the Liberation of Palestine (PFLP) (1967–present)

Oceania
 Bougainville Revolutionary Army

References

External links
 Complete List of Terrorist and Insurgency Groups Worldwide (about 371 in all)

 
Guerrilla movements